Laurence James Duggan (born 1949), known as Laurie Duggan, is an Australian poet, editor, and translator.

Life
Laurie Duggan was born in Melbourne and attended Monash University, where his friends included the poets Alan Wearne and John A. Scott. Both he and Scott won the Poetry Society of Australia Prize (Scott 1970, Duggan 1971). He moved to Sydney in 1972 and became involved with the poetry scene there, in particular with John Tranter, John Forbes, Ken Bolton and Pam Brown.  Duggan lectured at Swinburne College ( 1976) and Canberra College of Advanced Education (1983).

His poetry grew out of contemplation of moments and found texts. His interest in bricolage started early: while still at Monash he was working on a series of 'Merz poems', short poems about discarded objects, inspired by the work of Kurt Schwitters. His book-length poem The Ash Range (1987) uses diaries, journals of pioneers, and newspaper articles in its construction of a history of Gippsland.

Awards
 1971 – Poetry Society of Australia Award for the poem East.
 1976 – Anne Elder Poetry Award for East: Poems 1970-1974.
 1988 – Victorian Premier's Award for The Ash Range.
 1989 – Welsey Michel Prize for The Epigrams of Martial.
 2003 – Age Poetry Book of the Year for Mangroves. 
 2004 – Australian Literature Society Gold Medal for Mangroves. 
 2007 – Queensland Premier's Literary Awards, Poetry Collection – Arts Queensland Judith Wright Calanthe Award for The Passenger.
 2012 – Grace Leven Prize for Poetry for The Collected Blue Hills.

Bibliography

Poetry

Collections

East: poems 1970-74 (Rigmarole of the Hours, 1976)
Under the Weather (Wild & Woolley, 1978)
Adventures in Paradise (1982)
The Great Divide: Poems 1973-83 (Hale & Iremonger, 1985)
The Ash Range (Picador, 1987)
Two Epigrams from Martial (Catnip Press, 1989)
All Blues : Eight Poems (Northern Lights, 1989)
Blue Notes (Picador, 1990) 
The Home Paddock : Blue Hills 21-35 (Noone's Press, 1991)
New and Selected Poems 1971-1993 (UQP, 1996) 
Mangroves (UQP, 2003) 
Compared to What: Selected Poems 1971-2003 (Shearsman, 2003) 
Let's Get Lost (Vagabond Press, 2005)
The Passenger (UQP, 2006) 
Allotments (Fewer and Fewer Press, 2011)
Catnips (Donnithorne Street Press, 2012)
The Pursuit of Happiness (Shearsman Books, 2012)
Leaving Here (light-trap press, 2012)
The Collected Blue Hills (Puncher & Wattmann, 2012)
East & Under the Weather (Puncher & Wattmann, 2014)
Selected Poems 1971-2017 (Shearsman Books, 2018) 
Afterimages (Polar Bear, Sydney, 2018)
Homer Street (Giramondo, Melbourne, 2020)

List of poems

Non-fiction
Ghost Nation:Imagined Space and Aust Visual Culture 1901-1939 (UQP, 2001)

Translations
The Epigrams of Martial (Pressed Wafer, 2010)

Notes

External links
Laurie Duggan's blog
Poems + Essays etc at Austlit
Laurie Duggan in Auckland at New Zealand Electronic Poetry Centre
Ten poems at Jacket Magazine
Thirty pieces at Great Works
Ornithology at Otis Rush
In Dialogue with Laurie Duggan by David McCooey
Review of Allotments by Laurie Duggan in Rochford Street Review
Review of The Pursuit of Happiness by Laurie Duggan in Rochford Street Review
Review of The Collected Blue Hills by Laurie Duggan in Rochford Street Review

1949 births
20th-century Australian poets
Living people
Poets from Melbourne
Monash University alumni
ALS Gold Medal winners
21st-century Australian poets